William Laidlaw may refer to:
William Laidlaw (poet) (1780–1845), Scottish poet
William G. Laidlaw (1840–1908), American politician
William Laidlaw (cricketer) (1912–1992), Scottish cricketer
Bill Laidlaw (1914–1941), Scottish golfer